Fort Copacabana is a military base at the south end of the beach that defines the district of Copacabana, Rio de Janeiro. The base is open to the public and contains the Museu Histórico do Exército (Army Historical Museum) and a coastal defense fort that is the actual Fort Copacabana.

History

The fort is built on a headland that originally contained a small chapel holding a replica of the Virgen de Copacabana, the patron saint of Bolivia. In 1908 the Brazilian army started to build a modern coastal defense fort on the headland to protect both the beach of Copacabana and the entrance to the harbour of Rio de Janeiro. The fort, completed in 1914, consists of two armoured cupolas, one holding a pair of  Krupp cannons, and the other a pair of  Krupp cannons.

The name of the turret with the 305mm guns is "Duque de Caxias", and the guns are named "Barroso" and "Osório". This cupola is behind and above that of the 190 mm guns so that it can fire over them. The name of the cupola with the 190 mm guns is "André Vidal".

Unlike the large Krupp guns, these 75 mm guns are no longer in place. The north casement is named "Antônio João" and the south casement is named "Ricardo Franco".

On 5 July 1922, the fort was the centre point of the 18 of the Copacabana Fort revolt. It was the first revolt of the tenentista movement, in the context of the Brazilian Old Republic. The rebellious officers turned the fort's guns on Rio de Janeiro. To suppress the revolt, the government brought the battleships São Paulo and Minas Geraes. On 6 July São Paulo bombarded the fort, firing five salvos and obtaining at least two hits; the fort surrendered half an hour later. Minas Geraes did not fire.

Brazil disbanded its coastal defense artillery branch in 1987. At that time the military deactivated the fort, at least as far as its role as a coastal artillery post was concerned. Except for the cupola at the fort on San Paolo Island outside the harbour of Taranto, the cupolas of Copacabana fort, together with other cupolas at nearby Fort Lage (Forte Tamandaré da Laje: 2 × 240 mm, 2 × 150 mm, and 2 × 2 × 75 mm) and Fort Imbui (Forte D. Pedro II do Imbuí: 2 × 280 mm L/40 and 2 × 2 × 75 mm L/25 Krupp guns), are the only remaining heavy fortress cupolas of the Krupp design in the world.

Visiting the fort

The hours for the Museum are 10 am to 6 pm and the fort are 10 am to 8 pm, Tuesday to Sunday and holidays. Admission for adults is R$6 per adult; there are discounts and free tours for the elderly and children. At the entrance to the base there is a guard in the uniform that was current when the fort was opened in 1914.

Museum and artillery park

The museum has several exhibits focusing on different periods and events in the history of the army in Brazil. The Brazilian Expeditionary Force's participation in the Italian campaign in World War II gets only limited treatment, and Brazil's involvement in World War I receives no treatment.

Outside the museum there are several artillery pieces from the late 19th and early 20th centuries. Brazil purchased this Hotchkiss revolving cannon in 1876. Another field piece is a British-made Vickers-Armstrong Mark XIX 6-inch (152.4 mm) gun, made in 1918. Brazil purchased this piece in 1940 for use in coastal defense. There are also three  Schneider M1919 mountain guns.

2016 Summer Olympics
For the 2016 Summer Olympics, the fort hosted the cycling road race (start and finish), marathon swimming and triathlon events.

Notes

References

External links

 Fort Copacabana Official Site and Museum of the History of the Army 
 Copacabana Fort Travel Guide

Copacabana
Coastal artillery
Copacabana, Rio de Janeiro
Museums in Rio de Janeiro (city)
Military and war museums in Brazil
Venues of the 2016 Summer Olympics
Olympic cycling venues
Olympic swimming venues
Olympic triathlon venues
Government buildings completed in 1914
1914 establishments in Brazil
Buildings and structures in Rio de Janeiro (city)